Dryadodaphne is a genus of flowering plants belonging to the family Atherospermataceae.

Its native range is New Guinea to Northern Queensland.

Species:

Dryadodaphne crassa 
Dryadodaphne novoguineensis 
Dryadodaphne trachyphloia

References

Atherospermataceae
Laurales genera